Andixius longispinus, is a species of planthoppers belonging to the family Cixiidae. It is endemic to China.

Body length of male is 6.2–6.5mm and female is 7.2 mm. Body and antennae yellowish brown. Eyes brown with faint yellow ocelli. Forewing semi-translucent. One long process arising from the base of the flagellum. A tan spot near claval fork found on the forewing.

References

Insects described in 2018
Cixiidae